Sanders Ford (c.1810 - 1873) was a farmer and state legislator in South Carolina. He was elected to represent Fairfield County, South Carolina in the South Carolina Senate in 1872, and died in office in 1873.

Ford was born in South Carolina and enslaved. After the American Civil War he had a farm near Winnsboro. Henry Johnson contested his election. Ford was one of four African Americans to represent Fairfield County in the state senate during the Reconstruction era. His grandson Nick Aaron Ford was a black studies scholar and the first college graduate in the family.

See also
African-American officeholders during and following the Reconstruction era

References

African-American farmers
Farmers from South Carolina
1873 deaths
South Carolina state senators
African-American politicians during the Reconstruction Era
American freedmen
People from Winnsboro, South Carolina
African-American state legislators in South Carolina
1810s births
Year of birth uncertain